Parnelia "Nell" Augustine (1884–1960) was an American painter. Her work can be seen at the Museum of Nebraska Art. She was born in Grand Island, Nebraska, the daughter of Dietrick, a printer, and Margaret Spethman. At the age of 14, she received special attention for her drawing at the 1898 Trans-Mississippi and International Exposition in Omaha, Nebraska.

References

1884 births
1960 deaths
People from Grand Island, Nebraska
American women painters
Painters from Nebraska
20th-century American painters
20th-century American women artists